Bolitaena is a genus of pelagic octopods from the subfamily Bolitaeninae in the family Amphitretidae. It contains two species, a third species Bolitaena microcotyla is now regarded as a synonym of Haliphron atlanticus.

The genus contains bioluminescent species.

References

Octopuses
Cephalopod genera
Bioluminescent molluscs